The Ambassador Extraordinary and Plenipotentiary of the Kingdom of Sweden to the United States of America is in charge of Sweden's diplomatic mission to the United States.

The Swedish Embassy is located at the House of Sweden (inaugurated in 2006) at 2900 K Street in Washington, D.C. Previously the embassy was housed in rented space at, first Watergate 600, and later, 1501 M Street N.W.

List of Ambassadors

Resident Ministers 
1782 Samuel Gustaf Hermelin
1812–1819 Johan Albert Kantzow

Charge d´Affaires 
1819–1831 Berndt Robert Gustaf Stackelberg
1831–1833 David Gustaf Anckarloo
1834–1837 Severin Lorich
1838–1845 Gustaf af Nordin
1845–1850 Adam Christoffer Lovenskiold
1850–1854 Georg Sibbern

Resident Ministers 
1854–1858 Georg Sibbern
1858–1860 Nils Erik Wilhelm af Wetterstedt
1861–1864 Carl Edward Vilhelm Piper

Envoys 
1864–1870 Nils Erik Wilhelm af Wetterstedt
1870–1875 Oluf Stenerson
1876–1884 Carl Lewenhaupt (Sweden's Foreign Minister 1889 to 1895)
1884–1888 Gustaf Lennart Reuterskiöld 
1889–1906 Johan Anton Wolff Grip
1907–1910 Herman Lagercrantz
1910–1911 Albert Ehrensvärd (Sweden's Foreign Minister 1911 to 1914)
1912–1920 Wilhelm August Ferdinand Ekengren
1921–1926 Axel Fingal Wallenberg 
1925–1945 Wollmar Boström 
1945–1947 Herman Eriksson

Ambassadors Extraordinary and Plenipotentiary (from 1947) 
1947–1948   Herman Eriksson
1948–1958 Erik Boheman
1958–1964 Gunnar Jarring
1964–1972 Hubert de Bèsche
1972 Yngve Möller  (appointed but never took admission due to a break in Swedish–American diplomatic relations.)
1974–1989 Wilhelm Wachtmeister 
1989–1993 Anders Thunborg 
1993–1997 Henrik Liljegren 
1997–2000 Rolf Ekéus 
2000–2005 Jan Eliasson (Sweden's Foreign Minister between April to October 2006),  Deputy Secretary-General of the United Nations
2005–2007 Gunnar Lund  
2007–2013 Jonas Hafström
2013–2017 Björn Lyrvall
2017–present Karin Olofsdotter

See also 
Sweden–United States relations
List of diplomatic missions of Sweden
United States Ambassador to Sweden

References

United States 
Sweden